From the Ground Up is an album by Birmingham-based experimental folk band Shady Bard. It was the first full-length album recorded by the band and released by Static Caravan Recordings.

Track listing
 "Fires" – 4:08
 "Bobby" – 3:48
 "These Quiet Times" – 3:38
 "Frozen Lake" – 1:12
 "Treeology" – 3:17
 "Torch Song" – 4:07
 "Memory Tree" – 4:30
 "Penguins" – 4:51
 "From the Ground Up" – 3:30
 "Winter Coats" – 3:03
 "Summer Came When We Were Falling Out" – 3:22
 "Dust" – 2:33 (Japanese edition only)
 "What's Behind the Door? – 3:54 (Japanese edition only)

References 

2010 albums
Shady Bard albums
Static Caravan Recordings albums